Duncan Brown (born 18 February 1972) is a South African former cricketer. He played in one first-class match for Eastern Province in 1991/92.

See also
 List of Eastern Province representative cricketers

References

External links
 

1972 births
Living people
South African cricketers
Eastern Province cricketers
People from Makhanda, Eastern Cape
Cricketers from the Eastern Cape